Chlorogastropsis is a monotypic genus of bristle flies in the family Tachinidae.

Species
Chlorogastropsis orga (Walker, 1849)

Distribution
Australia.

References

Exoristinae
Tachinidae genera
Endemic fauna of Australia
Diptera of Australasia
Monotypic insect genera
Monotypic Brachycera genera
Taxa named by Charles Henry Tyler Townsend